JSC ZAZ Stadium is a multi-use stadium in Zaporizhzhia, Ukraine that belongs to the Zaporizhzhia Car-manufacturing Plant (ZAZ). The stadium's capacity is 15,000 people.

The stadium is located right next to the factory, just across a railroad. It is located in the southern part of the city and urban residential area. Near the stadium flows a small river Mokra-Moskovka which is a left tributary of Dnieper. Near the stadium is located a train station Zaporizhzhia-1, while the stadium itself is about mile away down the Kosmichna vulytsia (local street) from the main highway M18/E105. 

Originally the stadium was a home to the factory team FC Torpedo Zaporizhzhia that existed in 1982–2002.

In 2001-2006, the stadium was the home of FC Metalurh Zaporizhya as the Ukrainian Top League suspended Metaurh's home stadium in 2001 due to safety concerns. In July 2006, the team returned to its renovated Slavutych Arena. 

Here on 7 May 2002, during the Ukrainian Top League game Metalurh - Dynamo, Valeriy Lobanovsky received a heart attack, after which five days later he died in one of the Zaporizhzhia city clinics.

References

Football venues in Ukraine
Sport in Zaporizhzhia
Buildings and structures in Zaporizhzhia
FC Metalurh Zaporizhzhia
ZAZ
FC Torpedo Zaporizhzhia
Sports venues in Zaporizhzhia Oblast